Sawyer Bay is an Arctic waterway in Qikiqtaaluk Region, Nunavut, Canada. It is located in Nares Strait by eastern Ellesmere Island. Benedict Glacier fills the head of the bay.

Exploration
Robert Peary's 1905-1906 exploration included this bay.

References

Bays of Qikiqtaaluk Region
Ellesmere Island